Live is a 2001 live album by Texas-based blues rock band The Fabulous Thunderbirds. Recorded on the evening of February 16, 2000, the concert made history somewhat for becoming the first ever to be broadcast over the internet using high-definition cameras. It was also released on DVD titled Invitation Only. Some versions of the album are titled This Night in L.A..

Track listing
 "Introduction" (Dave Adleson) - 0:07
 "Wait On Time" (Kim Wilson) - 4:12
 "My Babe" (Ron Holden) - 5:47
 "The Things I Used To Do" (Eddie Jones) - 5:46
 "The Hustle Is On" (H. Eddy Owens) - 3:27
 "I Can Tell" (Samuel Smith) - 4:02
 "Look Whatcha Done' (Sam Magnett) - 4:46
 "Wrap It Up" (Isaac Hayes, David Porter) - 3:01
 "Early Every Morning" (B.B. King, Joe Josea) - 5:37
 "She's Tough" (Jerry McCain) - 4:54
 "I Believe I'm In Love" (Wilson) - 3:35
 "Tuff Enuff" (Wilson) - 5:41
 "People Will Be People" (Dave Egan) - 4:15
 "Where Were You" (Smiley Lewis) - 5:37

Personnel
 Kim Wilson - lead vocals, harmonica
 Kid Ramos - guitar
 Willie J. Campbell - bass
 Stephen Hodges - drums
 Gene Taylor - piano
 David K. Mathews - organ
 Lee Thornberg - trumpet
 Jeff Turmes, Steven Marsh - saxophones
 Mindy Stein, Valerie Pinkston - backing vocals

References

External links
Official Site

The Fabulous Thunderbirds albums
2001 live albums
Sanctuary Records live albums